Yaga may refer to:

 Yajna, a Vedic fire ritual
 Yaga Gathering, a music festival in Lithuania
 Baba Yaga, a supernatural, witch-like being in Slavic mythology
 Baba Yaga (Dungeons & Dragons), a creature in the fantasy roleplaying game Dungeons & Dragons; patterned on the character from Slavic myth
 Geraldine Yaga Grimm, a character in the animated show Mysticons
A race of cruel, black-skinned, winged humanoids from Robert E. Howard's 1939 planetary romance novel, Almuric.

See also
 Daksha yajna, a mythological event in which the god Daksha arranges for his daughter Sati to immolate herself
 Yaga Station (disambiguation)